Papa Benji is a comedy web series that follows the life of its eponymous character, Papa Benji, a pepper soup joint owner and everyone surrounding him.

Plot 
Papa Benji is a story about the Egwuowun family, their pepper soup joint and their son Benjamin. Peter Egwuowun owns one of the best Pepper Soup joint in the 60s and no one knew his recipes except for Benjamin his son. Benjamin had dreams to become a banker and invest in his father's Pepper Soup business but his dreams were cut short when his parents died in an accident and his uncle ran the business down, and he wasn't able to further his education. He later became the Head of security in a bank when he grew up and on his 45th birthday celebration, he prepared pepper soup with his father's recipes for his colleagues and everyone was blown away asking for more, including the bank manager.
He was later given a loan by the bank to start the Pepper Soup business.
Papa Benji's wife on the other hand is a failed fashion designer who owns a shop next to their house but was always gossiping with her friends, she also very spiritual and believes in too much fasting and prayers.
Benjamin(Jnr) their son is a marlian who loves music and he is an upcoming musician who doesn't know how to sing that much.
Mr Jiminus and Papa Solo are both pensioners who are regular customers at Papa Benji's pepper soup joint including Mr Pius who is there always supporting anyone of the two who buys him drink.
Papa Benji tells the story of an Igbo man, his family, his customers, everything and everyone surrounding them in a funny way.

Cast 

Senator (comedian) as Benjamin Engwuowun/Papa Benji
Ekwitosi as Mrs Engwuowun/Mama Benji
OG Tega as Benjamin(Jnr)
Basketmouth as Mr Jiminus
Buchi as Papa Solo
Nedu as Mr Pius
Sound Sultan as Prof Alloy
Broda Shaggi as K Money
Maleke as Sean Witherman
Mr Paul as Noble
Real Warri Pikin as Philomena
Jemima Osunde as Jenifer
Brainjotter as Collins
Romeo WJ as Chinny
MC Forever as Pastor Godspower
Sylvia Adora as Ada
Oluwatobi Delalu as Kemi
Eme-Uche Chidera as Professor Rufus
Uche Obunse as Ella

Release 

On the 19th of November 2020, Basketmouth released the official Soundtrack album of the web series titled Yabasi.
He also posted the 6 minutes introductory episode as trailer on October 1, 2020, via his YouTube channel.

The show was supposed to air its first episode on 30 October 2020 but was later aired on 12 December 2020.

See also 
List of web television series
Basketmouth
Yabasi

References 

Nigerian web series
2020 web series debuts